Colin Askey (born 3 October 1932) is an English former footballer who played on the right wing. He made a total of 341 league and cup appearances in a 15-year career in the English Football League, scoring 40 goals. His son, John Askey, played for and managed Macclesfield Town.

He is most famed for his time at Port Vale, where he scored 23 goals in 217 games between 1949 and 1958. This period was one of the most memorable in the club's history, as the "Valiants" stormed to the Third Division North title and FA Cup semi-finals in 1953–54. Following this he spent four years with Walsall and then two years at Mansfield Town. He won two successive promotions with the "Saddlers" in 1959–60 and 1960–61, and also won promotion out of the Fourth Division with the "Stags" in 1962–63. He then went into non-league football, playing for Wellington Town, Stafford Rangers, Winsford United, Macclesfield Town, and Milton United.

Playing career

Port Vale
Askey was a ground-staff boy at Port Vale in 1947.
Askey came through the Port Vale juniors to sign professional forms in October 1949. He had the option of signing with Stoke City or Bolton Wanderers, but felt he had more chance to win a first team place at The Old Recreation Ground. He played four Third Division South games for Gordon Hodgson's "Valiants" in 1949–50, though spent much of his time serving his conscription with the RAF. He featured seven times in 1951–52 and ten times in 1952–53, and scored his first senior goal on 6 April 1953, in a 2–2 draw with Chester City at Sealand Road. He scored six goals in 53 appearances in 1953–54, as Freddie Steele's side won the Third Division North title and reached the FA Cup semi-finals. Following his performance in a win at Ninian Park, First Division club Cardiff City made a blank cheque offer which was refused in January 1954. Cardiff made the blank cheque offer after Vale initially rejected an offer of £30,000. Vale also recorded a win over Stanley Matthews' Blackpool on the way to the semi-finals, and were only denied a place in the final itself after some debatable refereeing decisions handed West Bromwich Albion victory in the semi-finals. He later recalled that Albert Leake's equalising goal was incorrectly ruled out for offside as "I'd pulled it back to him".

Askey scored four goals in 39 Second Division games in 1954–55. He made 26 appearances in 1955–56, before he scored five goals in 39 games in 1956–57, as Vale suffered relegation under new boss Norman Low. He scored seven goals in 37 games in 1957–58, before he departed Vale Park when he was sold to Walsall for 'a fairly substantial fee' in July 1958. However, he continued to train at Vale Park until 17 December 1960, when he angered Norman Low by "celebrating too much" after helping Walsall beat Vale 6–2. Following that incident he trained at the Victoria Ground.

Walsall
The "Saddlers" finished sixth in the Fourth Division in 1958–59, just six points outside the promotion places. Bill Moore's side went on to win the league title in 1959–60, before winning a second successive promotion with a second-place finish in the Third Division in 1960–61. The Fellows Park outfit posted a 14th-place finish in the Second Division in 1961–62, before Askey moved on to Mansfield Town.

Mansfield Town
Askey joined Mansfield Town on a free transfer in 1962.
He had spent 18 months on the sidelines after a horrific challenge from Port Vale's Roy Pritchard. The "Stags" won promotion out of the Fourth Division in fourth place in 1962–63 under Raich Carter's stewardship, and then finished seventh in the Third Division in 1963–64 under Tommy Cummings.

Later career
Askey then departed Field Mill and went on to play for Wellington Town (Southern League), Stafford Rangers, Winsford United, Macclesfield Town, Milton United, and pub teams 'The Ancient Briton' and 'The Miner's Arms' (in Milton).

Style of play
Former teammate Roy Sproson said that: "only his lack of real speed stopped Colin from becoming a great player because he had all the other equipment. A good crosser of the ball, Colin would take defenders on and was as brave as a lion, too", with a good "overall consistency." He was fit enough to track back and defend when the opposition was in possession – a rare trait for attackers of the 1950s. His former goalkeeper at Port Vale, Ray King, said that "He would consistently display a level of skill and an indomitable strength that were quite amazing" and he was impressed with his "phenomenal work rate" and the way that he "beat an opponent with comparative ease and passed and crossed the ball using either foot with supreme accuracy."

Management career
After finally retiring from football, he became the manager, later chairman, of Milton United. He also managed the Ind Coope Sunday League team before becoming the northern area manager of the Staffordshire Football Association. After retiring as a player he worked in the insurance industry.

Personal life
Askey has five children: Bob, Mark, Steve, John and Joanne. John played for and managed Macclesfield Town before becoming manager of Port Vale, his father's club. Bob managed Newcastle Town. His grandson, James Askey, played amateur football for Newcastle Town.

Career statistics
Source:

Honours
Port Vale
Football League Third Division North: 1953–54

Walsall
Football League Fourth Division: 1959–60
Football League Third Division second-place promotion: 1960–61

Mansfield Town
Football League Fourth Division fourth-place promotion: 1962–63

References

Footballers from Stoke-on-Trent
English footballers
Association football wingers
Port Vale F.C. players
Walsall F.C. players
Mansfield Town F.C. players
Telford United F.C. players
Stafford Rangers F.C. players
Winsford United F.C. players
Macclesfield Town F.C. players
Milton United F.C. (Staffs) players
English Football League players
Southern Football League players
English football managers
1932 births
Living people